Panaorus csikii is a species of dirt-colored seed bug in the family Rhyparochromidae found in eastern Asia.

References

External links

 

Rhyparochromidae